Blocton may refer to:
Blocton, West Virginia
West Blocton, Alabama
Blocton Italian Catholic Cemetery, a cemetery in West Blocton, Alabama